The Ridge may refer to:

 The Ridge, later Major Ridge, a Cherokee Indian leader

The Ridge may refer to the following places:

United States
 The Ridge (Ridgeville, Georgia), listed on the NRHP in Georgia, National Register of Historic Places listings in McIntosh County, Georgia
 The Ridge (Derwood, Maryland), listed on the NRHP in Maryland
 The Ridge (Manchester, Ohio), listed on the NRHP in Ohio
 The Ridge at Danbury, an office complex
 The Ridge Motorsports Park, racing circuit in Shelton, Washington

India
 Delhi Ridge, a forested ridge in Delhi, India that shields the city of Delhi from desert winds from Rajasthan